Gymnastics events were competed at the 1990 South American Games in Lima, Peru, in December 1990.

Medal summary

Medal table

Artistic gymnastics

Rhythmic gymnastics

References 

South American Games
1990 South American Games
1990 South American Games